Hickley is a surname.

List of people with the surname 

 Anthony Hickley (1906–1972), English first-class cricketer
 Cecil Hickley (1865–1941), British Royal Navy officer
 Charles Hickley (1862–1935), English first-class cricketer and barrister
 Frank Hickley (1895–1972), English cricketer
 Henry Hickley (1826–1903), British Royal Navy officer
 William Hickley Gross (1837–1898), American bishop

See also 

 Hickey (surname)
 Hinkley
 Mickley (disambiguation)
 Tickley

Surnames
English-language surnames
Surnames of English origin
Surnames of British Isles origin